Exford may refer to:

 Exford, Victoria, a town in Australia
 Exford, Somerset, a village in England